African Handball Super Cup or Super Cup Babacar Fall is an annual international club handball competition run by the African Handball Confederation. It is between the winners of the Champions League and the Cup Winners' Cup.

Finals

Winners by club

Rq:
GS Pétroliers (ex. MC Alger HB)

Winners by country

See also
 African Handball Champions League
 African Handball Cup Winners' Cup
 African Women's Handball Championship

References

External links
Super Cup Babacar Fall - cahbonline

 
African Handball Confederation competitions
African handball club competitions
Recurring sporting events established in 1994
1994 establishments in Africa
Multi-national professional sports leagues